Tekkali Assembly constituency is a constituency in Srikakulam district of Andhra Pradesh. It is one of the seven assembly segments of Srikakulam (Lok Sabha constituency), along with Ichchapuram, Palasa, Pathapatnam, Srikakulam, Amadalavalasa and Narasannapeta. , there are a total of 222,222 electors in the constituency. In 2019 state assembly election, Kinjarapu Atchannaidu was elected as the MLA of the constituency, representing the Telugu Desam Party.

Overview
Constituency Details of Tekkali (Assembly constituency):

Country: India.
 State: Andhra Pradesh.
 District: Srikakulam district.
 Region: Coastal Andhra.
 Seat: Unreserved.
 Eligible Electors as per 2019 General Elections: 2,22,222 Eligible Electors. Male Electors: 1,12,093. Female Electors:1,10,110.

Mandals 

The four mandals that form the assembly constituency.

Members of Legislative Assembly

Following is the list of members who got elected from Tekkali (Assembly constituency) to the Andhra Pradesh Legislature until date.

Election results

Assembly elections 1952

Assembly elections 2004

Assembly elections 2009

Assembly elections 2014

Assembly elections 2019

See also 
 List of constituencies of the Andhra Pradesh Legislative Assembly

References 

Assembly constituencies of Andhra Pradesh